Adventure Science Center is a non-profit science museum for children located in Nashville, Tennessee.

The museum features over 175 hands-on interactive exhibits with themes including biology, physics, visual perception, listening, mind, air and space, energy and earth science. The building includes 44,000 square feet of exhibit space, a 75-foot-tall adventure tower and the Sudekum Planetarium.

History
The organization was opened in 1945 as the Children’s Museum of Nashville, under the vision of naturalist John Ripley Forbes, and was located in Lindsley Hall in downtown Nashville. The first planetarium opened in 1952. In 1974 the museum moved to its current location in Old Saint Cloud Hill, the site of Fort Negley during the American Civil War.

The organization’s name changed over the years, most recently from Cumberland Science Museum to Adventure Science Center in November 2002.

References

External links
 Adventure Science Center

Museums in Nashville, Tennessee
Science museums in Tennessee
Children's museums in Tennessee
Museums established in 1945
Planetaria in the United States
1945 establishments in Tennessee